Kurt Oskar "Kurre" Wires (28 April 1919 – 22 February 1992) was a Finnish sprint canoer who competed in the 1948 and 1952 Olympics. In 1948 he won a silver medal in the individual 10000 m event. Four years later he earned two gold medals in the 1000 m and 10000 m doubles, together with Yrjö Hietanen.

Personal life
Wires served in the Finnish Army during the Second World War and lost his right eye during the Continuation War.

References

1919 births
1992 deaths
Sportspeople from Helsinki
Swedish-speaking Finns
Canoeists at the 1948 Summer Olympics
Canoeists at the 1952 Summer Olympics
Finnish male canoeists
Olympic canoeists of Finland
Olympic gold medalists for Finland
Olympic silver medalists for Finland
Olympic medalists in canoeing

Medalists at the 1952 Summer Olympics
Medalists at the 1948 Summer Olympics
Finnish military personnel of World War II
Finnish disabled sportspeople